Bolshaya Karpovka is a rural locality (a village) in Denisovskoye Rural Settlement, Gorokhovetsky District, Vladimir Oblast, Russia. The population was 27 as of 2010.

Geography 
Bolshaya Karpovka is located 22 km southwest of Gorokhovets (the district's administrative centre) by road. Chulkovo is the nearest rural locality.

References 

Rural localities in Gorokhovetsky District